Gerald Mohr (June 11, 1914 – November 9, 1968) was an American radio, film, and television character actor and frequent leading man, who appeared in more than 500 radio plays, 73 films, and over 100 television shows.

Early years

Mohr was born in Manhattan to Henrietta (née Neustadt), a singer, and Sigmond Mohr. He was educated in Dwight Preparatory School in Manhattan, where he learned to speak French and German and also learned to ride horses and play the piano.

At Columbia University, where he was on a course to become a doctor, Mohr was struck with appendicitis and was recovering in a hospital when another patient, a radio broadcaster, realised Mohr's pleasant baritone voice would be ideal for radio. Mohr was hired by the radio station and became a junior reporter.

Stage

In the mid-1930s, Orson Welles invited him to join his formative Mercury Theatre. During his time with Welles, Mohr gained theatrical experience on Broadway in The Petrified Forest and starred in Jean Christophe.

Radio
Mohr made more than 500 appearances in radio roles throughout the 1930s, '40s, and early '50s. One of his early starring roles on radio was as a replacement for Matt Crowley for a brief interval in Jungle Jim in 1938. He starred as Raymond Chandler's hardboiled detective, Philip Marlowe, 1948–1951, in 119 half-hour radio plays. He also starred in The Adventures of Bill Lance, and as Michael Lanyard in The Lone Wolf.

He was one of the actors who portrayed Archie Goodwin in The New Adventures of Nero Wolfe, frequently starred in The Whistler, and acted in different roles in multiple episodes of Damon Runyon Theater and Frontier Town. He played multiple roles in the anthology series Crime Is My Pastime and was the narrator for the serial Woman from Nowhere.

Other radio appearances include The Jack Benny Program,  Our Miss Brooks, The Shadow of Fu Manchu, Box 13, Escape, and Lux Radio Theatre.

In the early 1950s, Mohr made a series of recordings for the Voice of America. Unlike most material for the VOA, these were intended for broadcast by radio stations in the United States, with the goal of debunking propaganda broadcast from behind the Iron Curtain.

Film

Mohr began appearing in films in the late 1930s, playing his first villain role in the 15-part cliffhanger serial Jungle Girl (1941). After three years' service in the US Army Air Forces during World War II, he returned to Hollywood, starring as Michael Lanyard in three movies of The Lone Wolf series in 1946–47. He had supporting roles in the film classics Gilda (1946) and Detective Story (1951), and co-starred in The Magnificent Rogue (1946) and The Sniper (1952)

In 1964 Mohr, together with his second wife Mai, planned the formation of an international film company, headquartered in Stockholm, with Swedish and American writers. The company was to have featured comedy, adventure, crime, and drama shows for worldwide distribution. By then fluent in Swedish, he also planned to star in a film for TV in which his character, a newspaperman, would speak only Swedish. In 1964, he made a comedy Western, filmed in Stockholm and on location in Yugoslavia, called Wild West Story in which the good guys spoke Swedish and the bad guys (Mohr, inter alia) spoke in English.

In 1968, he appeared in his last film role as Tom Branca in William Wyler's Funny Girl.

Television
From the 1950s on, he appeared as a guest star in more than 100 television series, including the Westerns The Californians, Maverick with James Garner and Jack Kelly, Johnny Ringo, The Alaskans with Roger Moore, Lawman, Cheyenne (as Pat Keogh in episode "Rendezvous at Red Rock"/as Elmer Bostrum in episode "Incident at Dawson Flats") with Clint Walker, Bronco with Ty Hardin, Overland Trail (as James Addison Reavis, "the Baron of Arizona", in the episode "The Baron Comes Back") with William Bendix and Doug McClure, Sugarfoot with Will Hutchins, Bonanza (as Phil Reed in the episode "The Abduction", as Collins in the episode "Found Child", as Cato Troxell in the episode "A Girl Named George"), The Rifleman with Chuck Connors,  Wanted: Dead or Alive (episode "Till Death do us Part") with Steve McQueen, Death Valley Days (as Andrés Pico in "The Firebrand"), and Rawhide. In 1949, he was co-announcer, along with Fred Foy, and narrator of 16 of the shows of the first season of The Lone Ranger, speaking the well-known introduction as well as story details.  The narration was dropped after sixteen episodes.

Mohr guest-starred seven times in the 1957–62 television series Maverick, twice playing Western gambler Doc Holliday in "The Quick and the Dead" and briefly at the conclusion of "Seed of Deception", a role he reprised again in "Doc Holliday in Durango", a 30-minute 1958 episode of Tombstone Territory with Pat Conway. In one of the other Maverick episodes, he portrayed Steve Corbett, a character based on Bogart's in Casablanca. That episode, "Escape to Tampico," used parts of the set from the original film, this time as a Mexican saloon where Bret Maverick (James Garner) arrives to hunt down Mohr's character for an earlier murder. Mohr also appears on Maverick in "You Can't Beat the Percentage" playing a similar role to his turn in "Escape to Tampico". He portrays a Mexican outlaw in "The Burning Sky", and guest stars in "Mano Nera" and "The Deadly Image" with Jack Kelly as Bart Maverick.

Mohr also guest-starred on Crossroads, The DuPont Show with June Allyson, Harrigan and Son, The Barbara Stanwyck Show, It's Always Jan, Perry Mason with Raymond Burr, 77 Sunset Strip with Efrem Zimbalist Jr., Hawaiian Eye, Lost in Space with Guy Williams, Ripcord and many other television series of the era, especially those being produced by Warner Bros. Studios and Dick Powell's Four Star Productions.  He sang in the 1956 Cheyenne episode "Rendezvous at Red Rock". He also essayed Captain Vadim, an Iron Curtain submarine commander, in the Voyage to the Bottom of the Sea episode "The Lost Bomb".  In the series' fourth and final season (1968-69), Mohr guest-starred in the episode "Flight From San Miguel" on The Big Valley with Barbara Stanwyck.  This episode was broadcast posthumously in April 1969.

Mohr made guest appearances on such network television comedy shows as The George Burns and Gracie Allen Show (1951), How to Marry a Millionaire (1958), The Jack Benny Program (1961 & 1962), The Smothers Brothers Show (1965) and The Lucy Show (1968). He had the recurring role of newsman Brad Jackson in My Friend Irma (1952). He played "Ricky's friend", psychiatrist "Dr. Henry Molin" (real life name of the assistant film editor on the show), in the February 2, 1953 episode of I Love Lucy, "The Inferiority Complex". His repeated line was, "Treatment, Ricky. Treatment".

In 1954–1955, he starred as Christopher Storm in 41 episodes of the third season of Foreign Intrigue, produced in Stockholm for American distribution. During several episodes of Foreign Intrigue, but most noticeably in "The Confidence Game" and "The Playful Prince", he can be heard playing on the piano his own musical composition, "The Frontier Theme", so called because Christopher Storm was the owner of the Hotel Frontier in Vienna. Foreign Intrigue was nominated for an Emmy Award in 1954 under the category "Best Mystery, Action or Adventure Program" and again in 1955 under the category "Best Mystery or Intrigue Series".

Mohr made four guest appearances on Perry Mason (1961–66). In his first appearance, he played Joe Medici in "The Case of the Unwelcome Bride". In 1963, he played murder victim Austin Lloyd in "The Case of the Elusive Element". In 1964, he played the murderer, Alan Durfee, in "The Case of a Place Called Midnight". In 1966, he played agent Andy Rubin in the series' final episode, "The Case of the Final Fadeout".

He continued to market his powerful voice, playing Reed Richards (Mister Fantastic) in the Fantastic Four cartoon series during 1967 and Green Lantern in the 1968 animated series Aquaman.

Death
Mohr flew to Stockholm in September 1968, to star in the pilot of a proposed television series, Private Entrance, featuring Swedish actress Christina Schollin.

Shortly after the completion of filming, Mohr died of a heart attack in the evening of November 9, 1968, in Södermalm, Stockholm, aged 54. Mohr is interred in the columbarium of Lidingö Cemetery on the island of Lidingö, Sweden.

Family
Mohr's son, Anthony Jeffrey Mohr, was born in 1947 and later became a judge in the Los Angeles Superior courts.

Select filmography

Society Smugglers (1939) as Footman (uncredited)
Love Affair (1939) as Man (uncredited)
Panama Patrol (1939) as Pilot
Charlie Chan at Treasure Island (1939) as Dr. Zodiac (uncredited)
The Housekeeper's Daughter (1939) as Gangster (uncredited)
The Sea Hawk (1940) as Spanish Messenger (uncredited)
The Reluctant Dragon (1941) as Studio Guard / Narrator (segment "Baby Weems") (voice, uncredited)
The Monster and the Girl (1941)  as Munn
Jungle Girl (1941, Serial) as Slick Latimer
We Go Fast (1941) as Nabob of Borria
The Lady Has Plans (1942) as Joe Scalsi
Woman of the Year (1942) as Radio Emcee (voice, uncredited)
Dr. Broadway (1942) as Red
One Dangerous Night (1943) as Harry Cooper
Murder in Times Square (1943) as O'Dell Gissing
King of the Cowboys (1943) as Maurice – the Mental Marvel
Lady of Burlesque (1943) as Louie Grindero
Redhead from Manhattan (1943) as Chick Andrews
The Desert Song (1943) as Hassan (uncredited)
A Guy Could Change (1946) as Eddy Raymond
The Notorious Lone Wolf (1946) as Michael Lanyard / The Lone Wolf
Young Widow (1946) as Walter, the Wolf (uncredited)
Gilda (1946) as Capt. Delgado
The Truth About Murder (1946) as Johnny Lacka
Passkey to Danger (1946) as Malcolm Tauber
Dangerous Business (1946) as Duke
The Invisible Informer (1946) as Eric Baylor
The Magnificent Rogue (1946) as Mark Townley
The Lone Wolf in Mexico (1947) as Michael Lanyard
Heaven Only Knows (1947)  as Treason
The Lone Wolf in London (1947) as Michael Lanyard
Two Guys from Texas (1948) as Link Jessup
Bad Men of Tombstone (1949) as Narrator (uncredited)
Slightly French (1949) as J. B. (voice, uncredited)
The Blonde Bandit (1950) as Joe Sapelli
Wyoming Mail (1950) as Opening Narrator (voice, uncredited)
Undercover Girl (1950) as Reed Menig
Southside 1-1000 (1950) as Narrator (voice, uncredited)
Hunt the Man Down (1950) as Walter Long
Bullfighter and the Lady (1951) as Trailer Narrator (voice, uncredited)
Sirocco (1951) as Major Jean Leon
Detective Story (1951) as Tami Giacoppetti
Ten Tall Men (1951) as Kayeed Hussein
Smoky Canyon (1952) as Narrator (voice, uncredited)
The Sniper (1952) as Police Sgt. Joe Ferris
Montana Territory (1952) as Mid-Film Narrator (voice, uncredited)
The Duel at Silver Creek (1952) as Rod Lacy
Son of Ali Baba (1952) as Capt. Youssef
It Grows on Trees (1952) as Character in TV Western (voice, uncredited)
The Ring (1952) as Pete Ganusa
Invasion USA (1952) as Vince Potter
The Legend of the Lone Ranger (1952) as Narrator (voice, uncredited)
The 49th Man (1953) as Narrator (voice, uncredited)
Raiders of the Seven Seas (1953) as Captain Jose Salcedo
The Eddie Cantor Story (1953) as Rocky Kramer
Money from Home (1953) as Marshall Preston
Dragonfly Squadron (1954) as Capt. MacIntyre
The Night the World Exploded (1957) as Narrator (uncredited)
The Buckskin Lady (1957) as Slinger
Raiders of Old California (1957) as Narrator (uncredited)
Terror in the Haunted House (1958, aka My World Dies Screaming) as Philip Tierney
Guns, Girls, and Gangsters (1958) as Charles (Chuck) Wheeler
A Date with Death (1959) as Mike Mason / Louis Deverman
The Angry Red Planet (1959) as Col. Thomas O'Bannion
This Rebel Breed (1960) as Lt. Robert Brooks
Bat Masterson (1961) as villain Crimp Ward 
Wild West Story (1964)  as Enrico Gonzales
Fantastic Four (1967–68) as Mister Fantastic/Reed Richards (voice)
Funny Girl (1968) as Branca

References

Further reading
 Everett Aaker. TV Western Players of the Fifties: A Biographical Encyclopedia of all Cast Members in Western Series, 1950–1959. McFarland & Co. (1997); 
 Everett Aaker. Encyclopedia of Early Television Crime Fighters. McFarland & Co. (2006);

External links

Gerald Mohr: King of Atomic Cool

1914 births
1968 deaths
American expatriates in Sweden
American male film actors
American male television actors
American male voice actors
American male radio actors
American radio personalities
Male actors from New York City
20th-century American male actors